Nagatak (also Romanized as Nāgatak) is a village in Abreis Rural District, Bazman District, Iranshahr County, Sistan and Baluchestan Province, Iran. At the 2006 census, its population was 43, in 9 families.

References 

Populated places in Iranshahr County